Paul Lawson (born 2 December 1966) is a British boxer. He competed in the men's heavyweight event at the 1992 Summer Olympics.

References

External links
 

1966 births
Living people
British male boxers
Olympic boxers of Great Britain
Boxers at the 1992 Summer Olympics
Boxers from Greater London
Heavyweight boxers